Teuea Toatu is an I-Kiribati politician who is the current Vice-President and Minister for Finance & Economic Development in the Cabinet of Kiribati. He is 1 of 3 Members of the House of Assembly representing the constituency of Abaiang.
He was appointed Vice-President (Kauoman-ni-Beretienti) on 19 June 2019.
He graduated with a BA in accounting and economics form the University of the South Pacific in 1980, and completed a certificate in computing at the University of East Anglia in 1984. He subsequently completed his MSc at the University of Strathclyde and his PhD at the Australian National University.

References

Vice-presidents of Kiribati
Year of birth missing (living people)
Living people
University of the South Pacific alumni
Alumni of the University of Strathclyde
Australian National University alumni
Finance ministers of Kiribati
Government ministers of Kiribati
Members of the House of Assembly (Kiribati)
21st-century I-Kiribati politicians